Xerces may refer to:

Apache Xerces, a family of software packages for parsing and manipulating XML
Xerces blue (Glaucopsyche xerces), an extinct butterfly
 The Xerces Society, an environmental organization that focuses on invertebrates
 "Xerces", a song by Deftones on the album Saturday Night Wrist
 Xerces was the original French spelling of Xerxes I

See also
Xerxes (disambiguation), the English spelling of this name